Bronwyn Kidd (born 1969) is an Australian photographer known for fashion and portraiture who formerly resided in London 1992-2004, and now lives in Melbourne, Australia.

Early life
Bronwyn Kidd was born in Melbourne in 1969 to Robert Kidd (Melbourne, 1940–2004), a butcher, and Barbara Kidd (née Wilson, in Melbourne, 1942-2022). She undertook her upper-secondary education at Ivanhoe Girls' Grammar School 1983-1986, where, using her father's Pentax ME II Super, her interest in photography began. Moving up to a Canon F1 at RMIT University she undertook a Bachelor of Arts 1987-1989. There, lecturer Alex Syndikas introduced her to the work of Sarah Moon and she discovered Cecil Beaton, Norman Parkinson and Athol Shmith, all of whose works were an influence on her.

Career
Eager to begin a career, Kidd left art school early, and she took work as an assistant to local fashion photographers. She soon moved to the United Kingdom, in 1992, where she worked with fellow Australian Polly Borland and fashion photographer Clive Arrowsmith. At barely 23 years of age she was taken on by the Queen's couturier Sir Hardy Amies to shoot exclusively for his Savile Row seasonal collections and advertising. For these, she started to use a medium-format Rollei and hired famed British model Paula Hamilton. Kidd has expressed her angle on fashion as an admiration of beauty rather than mere 'sexiness'.

Since 1988 a number of her portraits of fashion designers, including Bella Freud, Bruce Oldfield (OBE), Caroline Charles and shoe designer Jimmy Choo have been on exhibition at, and are held in, the National Portrait Gallery, London. Of portraiture, Kidd has said;

In 2004 Kidd moved back to Australia where she continued her success, concentrating on advertising, but also continued her portraiture, capturing important Australian icons; actress Teresa Palmer, and photographer Bill Henson. Her portraits began to feature prominently in the national press, and subjects include Judge Betty King, Vicki Roach, Philip Lynch,  Rob Story, Fiona Smith, Kon Karapanagiotidis, Maxine Morand, Daniel Andrews, Helen Silver, Rod Eddington, Lindsay Tanner, Greg Hunt, Bernie Finn, Carole Francis, and artists Bill Henson, Sam Leach and Gareth Samson. In 2016 she co-created, with long-time collaborator the creative director Virginia Dowzer, the image used to promote the National Gallery of Victoria’s 200 Years of Australian Fashion exhibition.

Kidd is represented by MARS Gallery, Melbourne.

Personal life
Bronwyn Kidd in 2021 lives with her husband, son and step-son in outer Melbourne.

Selected awards
 2009 AIPP Celebrating Women in Photography
 2009 Mobius Advertising Awards

Exhibitions
 1998 National Portrait Gallery, London.
 2006 National Portrait Gallery, London. Chinese Connections
 2008 Strip Jack Naked, Bronwyn Kidd & Virginia Dowzer, Format Furniture, Flinders Lane, Melbourne
 2008 William and Winifred Bowness Prize, Monash Gallery of Art, Melbourne.
 2009 59.5 (Aka 100 Great Outfits), Melbourne, Cose Impanema - Collins Street, Melbourne
 2016 200 Years of Australian Fashion, National Gallery of Victoria
2019, 22 September – 30 November; Homage to Style, Living Arts Space, Bendigo
2020, August; Frankston Art Space.

Collections
 Hardy Amies
 National Portrait Gallery, London

Works

Publications about Bronwyn Kidd
 
 Professional Photographer, Collectors Edition 2010, ‘300 Secrets to success’ page 59.
 British Journal of Photography, 18.11.98, ‘Printers present’ page 17.

Publications of photographs

Selected editorial
 Fashion Trend Magazine Australia. Issue 31.
 ‘Dynasty’ Cover, pages, Fashion Trend Magazine Australia. Issue 23.
 ‘Queen’ Cover, pages 66–77 Inclusive. Fashion Trend Magazine Australia. Issue 15, ISSN 1832-6811.
 ‘Envy’ Cover, pages 102-111. Who Magazine, Dec.9, 2013. ISSN 1832-6811
 Dave Hughes and Kate Langbroek, pages 48–49. Who Magazine, 26 June 2006.

Advertising campaigns
 Victorian Racing Club 2015, Playground of Racing Royalty, with Grey Advertising.
 Melbourne Writers Festival: Where Stories Meet. Agency: J.Walter Thompson Melbourne.
L’Oréal
Olay

External links
 Official Website
 "Time With JOAN" Photographs, interviews and videos record Bronwyn Kidd portrait photoshoots of significant subjects

References

1969 births
Living people
20th-century Australian photographers
21st-century Australian photographers
Australian women photographers
Artists from Melbourne
RMIT University alumni
20th-century Australian women artists
21st-century Australian women artists
21st-century women photographers
20th-century women photographers
Australian photographers